Slavyanovo is a town in the Pleven Municipality, in Pleven Province, Bulgaria.

It lies in the Danubian Plain, to the north-northeast of Pleven. As of December 2009, it has a population of 4,422 inhabitants and the mayor is Asen Bachev.

Slavyanovo's old name is Turski Trastenik (Турски Тръстеник) and it existed in the 18th century. It was officially declared a town in 1974. Slavyanovo is a partner of German town Kaiserslautern. The population is mainly Eastern Orthodox and there is a church, but at least in the 1930s there was also a small Protestant community. Most residents are Bulgarians, though the town has a growing Roma population, also presently living descendants of Crimean Tatars.

Gallery

References

External links

 2003 local elections results 
 Radio and television in Slavyanovo from Predavatel.com 

Towns in Bulgaria
Populated places in Pleven Province